Tavs Harmens Neiiendam (12 December 1898, in Copenhagen – 3 May 1968) was a Danish actor, writer and director. He was the son of actors Nicolai and Jonna Neiiendam.

Neiiendam studied at the Royal Danish Theatre's Student School from 1918 to 1920 and was associated with this theatre for a number of years. He wrote several radio plays for the Danish national broadcasting service including "Melody of Murder" which was later filmed. He himself acted in relatively few films but covered more than 600 roles on radio.

His play "Inspiration to a Poet" was translated into English by Marianne Helwig. It was broadcast in 1937 on the BBC Home Service with a cast including Gerald Campion.<ref>The Times, Broadcasting: A Danish Play, 11 March 1937</ref>

Tavs Neiiendam is buried at Frederiksberg old cemetery.

FilmographyBalletten danser (Ballet dancer) - 1938 Damen med de lyse handsker (The lady with the bright gloves) - 1942 De tre skolekammerater (The three schoolmates) - 1944 Hatten er sat - 1947Mr. Petit - 1948 Kampen mod uretten (The struggle against injustice) - 1949 Nålen (Needle) - 1951 Alt dette og Island med - 1951 
 This Is Life (1953)Tre piger fra Jylland'' (Three girls from Jutland) - 1957

References

External links
 

1898 births
1968 deaths
Danish male film actors
Danish male actors
Danish male stage actors
Male actors from Copenhagen